Kate Simpson Hayes (Hayes; after first marriage, Simpson; after separation, Hayes; pen names, Mary Markwell, Elaine, Marka Wohl, Yukon Bill; 6 July 1856 - 15 January 1945) was a Canadian playwright, author, journalist, poet, teacher, milliner, and legislative librarian. She was a founding member of the Canadian Women's Press Club, and the first woman journalist in Western Canada.

Biography
Catherine Ethel Hayes was born in 1856, in Dalhousie, New Brunswick. Her parents were Patrick Hayes, a lumber merchant and storekeeper, and Anna Hagan Hayes, a school teacher.

A founding member of the Canadian Women's Press Club, she was the first woman journalist in the Canadian West. Hayes wrote for the Free Press, Winnipeg, and wrote poetry using the pen name Mary Markwell for the Regina, Saskatchewan Leader. She married Charles Bowman Simpson in 2 June 1882; they had two children before separating in 1889. She had a relationship with Nicholas Flood Davin, and they had two children. She was opposed to women being given the vote and she worked in the UK for a time encouraging other women to emigrate to Canada. She died in British Columbia in 1945. Her papers are housed at the Saskatchewan Archives, McGill University, and National Archives of Canada.

Personal life
Simpson had four children: Burke Hayes Simpson, Anna W Elaine ("Bonnie") Simpson, Henry Arthur Davin, and Agnes Agatha Davin.

Kate Simpson Hayes died in Victoria, British Columbia, 15 January 1945.

Selected works
 Prairie pot-pourri
 The legend of the West, 1908

References

Bibliography

19th-century Canadian women writers
19th-century Canadian poets
Canadian women journalists
Canadian women poets
19th-century Canadian journalists
Pseudonymous women writers
1856 births
Writers from New Brunswick
1945 deaths
Canadian women non-fiction writers
19th-century pseudonymous writers